Leonas Juozapaitis (18 January 1901 – 13 August 1980) was a Lithuanian footballer who competed in the 1924 Summer Olympics.

Juozapaitis was a midfielder for LFLS Kaunas when he got called up to represent Lithuania in their first ever international in 1923 against Estonia, the next year he played at the 1924 Summer Olympics in Paris, France, where they lost in the first round against Switzerland 0-9, his next two international matches also ended in defeat.

He was also a keen athlete and was the Lithuanian 2 km champion in 1922 and in the same year he played in the first Lithuanian basketball match.

References

1901 births
1980 deaths
Footballers from Vilnius
People from Vilensky Uyezd
Lithuanian footballers
Lithuania international footballers
Footballers at the 1924 Summer Olympics
Olympic footballers of Lithuania
Association football midfielders